The 1984 Dartmouth Big Green football team was an American football team that represented Dartmouth College during the 1984 NCAA Division I-AA football season. The Big Green tied for second-to-last in the Ivy League.

In its seventh season under head coach  Joe Yukica, the team compiled a 2–7 record but was outscored 222 to 174. Donald Pomeroy and Richard Weissman were the team captains.

The Big Green's 2–5 conference record tied for sixth in the Ivy League standings. Dartmouth was outscored 158 to 144 by Ivy opponents. 

Dartmouth played its home games at Memorial Field on the college campus in Hanover, New Hampshire.

Schedule

References

Dartmouth
Dartmouth Big Green football seasons
Dartmouth Big Green football